Trupiano is a surname. Notable people with the surname include:

Jerry Trupiano (born 1947), American radio sportscaster
Matthew Trupiano (1938–1997), American mob boss

See also
Trupiano v. United States, a United States Supreme Court case

Italian-language surnames